The following are international rankings of Argentina:

Demographics

Population ranked 37 in the world 
Life expectancy ranked 59 in the world

Economy
 

 The Wall Street Journal and the Heritage Foundation: 2012 Index of Economic Freedom, ranked 158 out of 179 countries 
Fraser Institute 2009 Economic Freedom of the World, ranked 119 of 141 countries
International Monetary Fund: GDP (nominal) per capita 2010, ranked 61 out of 182 countries
International Monetary Fund: GDP (nominal) 2010, ranked 27 out of 181 countries
World Economic Forum: Global Competitiveness Index 2011-2012, ranked 85 out of 142 countries

Education

Books published per country per year ranked 27 in the world

Environment

 Environmental Sustainability Index 2005, ranked 9 out of 146 countries
Yale University and Columbia University: Environmental Performance Index 2010, ranked 70 in the world
New Economics Foundation: 2012 Happy Planet Index ranked 17

Geography

Total land area ranked 8 among all countries

Globalization

 A.T. Kearney/Foreign Policy Magazine: Globalization Index 2010, ranked 70 out of 181 countries

Politics

 Transparency International: 2011 Corruption Perceptions Index, ranked  100 out of 182 countries
 Reporters Without Borders: 2011-2012 Press Freedom Index, ranked 47 out of 179 countries
Fund for Peace: 2012 Failed States Index ranked 145 out of 165 (inverted ranking)

Society

Economist Intelligence Unit: Quality-of-life index 2005, ranked 40 out of 111 countries
 United Nations: Human Development Index 2011, ranked 45 out of 187 countries
University of Leicester 2006 Satisfaction with Life Index, ranked 56 out of 178 countries
Gallup World Poll 2010, ranked 30 out of 155

Sports

Technology

Economist Intelligence Unit e-readiness rankings 2009, ranked 45 out of 70 countries
Total broadband Internet users ranked 20 in the world

Transportation

See also
Lists of countries
Lists by country
List of international rankings

References

Argentina